Helen Blanche Schleman (1902-1992), an Indiana native, was Purdue University's Dean of Women from 1947 to 1968.

During World War II she served for four years in the U.S. Coast Guard Women's Reserve and attained the rank of captain. A graduate of Northwestern University who earned master's degrees from Wellesley College and Purdue University, Schleman came to Purdue in 1934 as director of Duhme Hall, a women's residence hall. After her return to Purdue after a four-year leave of absence to serve in the military, Schleman succeeded Acting Dean Clair Coolidge and former Dean Dorothy C. Stratton as Purdue's Dean of Women in 1947.

Schleman retired from Purdue in 1968; her successor as Dean of Women was M. Beverly Stone. During her years at Purdue, Schleman was an advocate for women's rights and later became a founder and the first director of the Span Plan, a program that encourages adults to pursue a college education. Purdue University's Schleman Hall is named in her honor.

Notes

Further reading 
 
 

1902 births
1992 deaths
Northwestern University alumni
Wellesley College alumni
Purdue University alumni
United States Coast Guard personnel of World War II
Purdue University faculty